John Lawson Richards (6 October 1918 – 2 November 1944) was an English first-class cricketer and British Army officer.

Born in Williton in October 1918, Richards was educated at Monmouth School and Selwyn College, Cambridge, where he played several sports, including cricket. He entered Selwyn College in 1938, where he read mathematics. Between 24-26 May 1939, Richards made his only first-class appearance for Cambridge against Yorkshire, in which he was bowled twice for a duck and did not gain any runs.

On 8 June 1940, seven months after the outbreak of the Second World War, Richards was commissioned as a second lieutenant in the Royal Engineers, in which he was involved in bomb disposal. During leave periods in 1941 and 1942, he appeared for Cambridge in six wartime cricket matches. Richards was killed in the Netherlands on 2 November 1944 and is buried at Jonkerbos War Cemetery.

References

1918 births
1944 deaths
Sportspeople from Somerset
People educated at Monmouth School for Boys
Alumni of Selwyn College, Cambridge
English cricketers
Cambridge University cricketers
Royal Engineers officers
Bomb disposal personnel
British Army personnel killed in World War II
Burials at Jonkerbos War Cemetery
Military personnel from Somerset